Andrew S. Bowie (born 1952) is Professor of Philosophy and German at Royal Holloway, University of London and Founding Director of the Humanities and Arts Research Centre (HARC).

He has worked to promote a better understanding of German philosophy in the Anglophone analytical tradition - including the works of Johann Georg Hamann, Johann Gottfried von Herder, Immanuel Kant, Johann Gottlieb Fichte, Georg Wilhelm Friedrich Hegel, Novalis (Friedrich von Hardenberg), Friedrich Wilhelm Joseph Schelling, Karl Wilhelm Friedrich Schlegel, Karl Marx, Friedrich Nietzsche, Walter Benjamin, Martin Heidegger, Hans-Georg Gadamer, Theodor W. Adorno, Jürgen Habermas, Albrecht Wellmer and Manfred Frank.

Frank and Habermas have spoken highly of his work in this area - with Habermas calling his work "masterly" and Frank calling him an "exceptional scholar", whose work represents "the most knowledgeable presentation in English of the history of the German contribution to so-called continental philosophy". The philosopher Charles Taylor has described his work on music as "excellent and densely argued".

He has translated the works of Friedrich Wilhelm Joseph Schelling and Friedrich Schleiermacher. His recent work has focused on music and philosophy, and Adorno on the nature of philosophy. In addition to his philosophical work on music, he is a keen jazz saxophonist and has played with leading contemporary jazz musicians such as 
Al Casey and Humphrey Lyttelton.

He did his doctoral research on "History and the Novel" (1980) at the University of East Anglia, where he was taught by the renowned German writer and scholar W. G. Sebald (who later cited Bowie's work on Alexander Kluge in his Campo Santo). He studied German philosophy at the Free University of Berlin. He was Professor of Philosophy at Anglia Ruskin University until 1999. He was also Alexander von Humboldt Research Fellow at the Philosophy department of University of Tübingen. He is on the Advisory Council for the Institute of Philosophy, University of London.

His elder brother, Angus, is a classicist.

Bibliography 
 Schelling and Modern European Philosophy: An Introduction (1993)
 From Romanticism to Critical Theory (1997)
 Schleiermacher: 'Hermeneutics and Criticism' and Other Writings (ed) (1998)
 Aesthetics and Subjectivity: From Kant to Nietzsche (2nd edition, 2003)
 Introduction to German Philosophy: From Kant to Habermas (2003)
 Music, Philosophy, and Modernity (2009)
 Philosophical Variations: Music as 'philosophical Language''' (2010)
 German Philosophy: A Very Short Introduction (2010)
 Adorno and the Ends of Philosophy'' (2013)

References

External links
 Schelling, Adorno and All That Jazz - Andrew Bowie interviewed by Richard Marshall for 3:AM Magazine
 Professor Andrew Bowie - profile page on Royal Holloway website
 'The Future of Philosophy' - talk by Andrew Bowie, 10 December 2008
 Entry on Friedrich Wilhelm Joseph von Schelling by Andrew Bowie in Stanford Encyclopedia of Philosophy
 

Living people
1952 births
Alumni of the University of East Anglia
20th-century British philosophers
Continental philosophers
Frankfurt School
German philosophy
Academics of Royal Holloway, University of London
English philosophers